Dylan Ashley Frittelli (born 5 June 1990) is a South African professional golfer. He currently plays on the PGA Tour where he won the John Deere Classic in 2019. He previously played on the European Tour where  he won twice in 2017, the Lyoness Open and the AfrAsia Bank Mauritius Open.

Amateur career
Frittelli won the 2007 Callaway Junior World Golf Championships for boys aged 15 to 17.

Frittelli played college golf at the University of Texas, where he won the decisive match to lead his team to victory at the 2012 NCAA Championship. He represented South Africa in the Eisenhower Trophy in 2008 and 2010.

Professional career
Frittelli turned professional after the 2012 NCAA Championship and played on the European Tour via sponsors exemptions for the rest of the year. He started 2013 with a second-place finish in the Telkom PGA Championship behind Jaco van Zyl. He played most of the year on the Challenge Tour, winning his first tour event at the Kärnten Golf Open in June.

Frittelli's performances in early 2013 lifted him into the world top-300 but he then had two years of poor performances, dropping to 926 in the world rankings. He showed a return to form when losing a playoff for the Australian PGA Championship in late 2015. 2016 was a successful year with second place in the Golden Pilsener Zimbabwe Open, a tie for second in the Tayto Northern Ireland Open and then a second win on the Challenge Tour in the Rolex Trophy. He finished 8th in the Race to Oman rankings to earn a place on the 2017 European Tour.

In 2017 a tie for second place in the Eye of Africa PGA Championship and a playoff defeat in the Volvo China Open lifted Frittelli into the world top-100 for the first time. In June he won his first European Tour event, the Lyoness Open. At the end of the season he was runner-up in the Turkish Airlines Open and tied for 4th in the end-of-season DP World Tour Championship, Dubai, both Rolex Series events. He finished 19th in the Race to Dubai.

Frittelli won the AfrAsia Bank Mauritius Open in December 2017 beating Arjun Atwal at the first hole of a playoff.

In 2018, Frittelli played some PGA Tour events because of sponsor's exemptions and his world ranking. He earned enough points to qualify for the Web.com Tour Finals. At the Web.com Tour Finals, he secured his PGA Tour card for the 2018–19 season.

Fritelli won the John Deere Classic in July 2019 by shooting 21-under par. It was his maiden PGA Tour victory and qualified him for the 2019 Open Championship in Northern Ireland.

Amateur wins
2007 Callaway Junior World Golf Championships
2008 South African Boys' Championship

Professional wins (6)

PGA Tour wins (1)

European Tour wins (2)

1Co-sanctioned by the Asian Tour and the Sunshine Tour

European Tour playoff record (1–2)

Asian Tour wins (1)

1Co-sanctioned by the European Tour and the Sunshine Tour

Asian Tour playoff record (1–0)

Sunshine Tour wins (1)

1Co-sanctioned by the European Tour and the Asian Tour

Sunshine Tour playoff record (1–1)

Challenge Tour wins (2)

Big Easy Tour wins (1)

Results in major championships

Results not in chronological order in 2020.

CUT = missed the half-way cut
"T" = tied
NT = No tournament due to COVID-19 pandemic

Results in The Players Championship

CUT = missed the halfway cut
"T" indicates a tie for a place

Results in World Golf Championships

1Cancelled due to COVID-19 pandemic

"T" = tied
QF, R16, R32, R64 = Round in which player lost in match play
NT = No tournament

Team appearances
Amateur
Eisenhower Trophy (representing South Africa): 2008, 2010

Professional
World Cup (representing South Africa): 2018

See also
2016 Challenge Tour graduates
2018 Web.com Tour Finals graduates

References

External links

Texas Longhorns profile

South African male golfers
Texas Longhorns men's golfers
European Tour golfers
Sunshine Tour golfers
PGA Tour golfers
Korn Ferry Tour graduates
Golfers from Johannesburg
White South African people
1990 births
Living people